SC Germania Breslau was a German association football club from the city of Breslau, Lower Silesia (today Wroclaw, Poland). The team spent several seasons in upper tier regional play in the Südostdeutscher Fußball-Verband (Southeast German Football Association) and advanced to the league playoffs in 1911 and 1912.

In both appearances Germania advanced to the league final. A 2:3 loss in 1911 to Askania Forst was annulled after protest, but the team then also lost the rematch (0:3). In the following season's final they were beaten 1:5 by ATV Liegnitz. In 1913 the team merged with Preußen Breslau to form Vereinigte Breslauer Sportfreunde.

References

Football clubs in Germany
Defunct football clubs in Germany
Association football clubs established in 1904
Defunct football clubs in former German territories
Football clubs in Wrocław
History of Wrocław